Bort-les-Orgues  is a commune in the Corrèze department in central France.

Geography 
Bort-les-Orgues is situated on the Dordogne.

The river Rhue forms part of the commune's southeastern border, then flows into the Dordogne.

Sights 
Bort-les-Orgues takes its name from les Orgues, a 2 km long cliff of volcanic columnar basalt 80m to 100m high, at the foot of which it lies.
The waterfall from the Saut de la Saule on the Rhue.
Another touristic feature is the medieval Château de Val located in Lanobre, emerging from the side of a lake created by a high dam built on the river.

Population

Personalities
Bort-les-Orgues was the birthplace of the philosopher Jean-François Marmontel (1723–1799).
Lina Margy (1914–1973), the famous French singer of the Le Petit Vin blanc was born in Rue de Piechecros, in Bort-les-Orgues.

See also
Pierre Tornade (21 January 1930 – 7 March 2012) was a French actor. He appeared in 128 films and television shows between 1956 and 1998.
Communes of the Corrèze department

References

External links 

 Official site
 Château de Val

Communes of Corrèze
Corrèze communes articles needing translation from French Wikipedia
Limousin